Too Many Girls is a 1940 American musical comedy film directed by George Abbott, who had also directed the hit Broadway musical on which it was based, which ran for 249 performances. The film's screenplay is by John Twist, and it stars Lucille Ball, Richard Carlson, Ann Miller, Eddie Bracken, Frances Langford, Desi Arnaz and Hal Le Roy. It was released on October 8, 1940, by RKO Pictures. Both Desi Arnaz and Lucille Ball credited the production for bringing them together. They married on November 30, 1940, less than two months after the film's release.

Plot
Connie Casey (Lucille Ball), an energetic celebrity heiress, wants to go to Pottawatomie College in Stop Gap, New Mexico, her father's alma mater, to be near her latest beau, British playwright Beverly Waverly (Douglas Walton). To protect her, and without her knowledge, her tycoon father (Harry Shannon) sends four Ivy League football players as her bodyguards, Clint Kelly (Richard Carlson), Jojo Jordan (Eddie Bracken), Manuelito (Desi Arnaz) and Al Terwilliger (Hal Le Roy), who sign a contract with an "anti-romance" clause.

The college is in bad financial straits and the bodyguards use their salaries to help the college. They also join the college's terrible football team, which immediately becomes one of the best in the country. Clint falls in love with Connie, but when she discovers he is her bodyguard, she decides to go back East. The bodyguards follow her, leaving the team in the lurch.  The people of Stop Gap go after them, and they are brought back just in time for the big game.  Connie declares her love for Clint, and he leads the team to victory.

Cast 

 Lucille Ball as Connie Casey 
 Richard Carlson as Clint Kelly
 Ann Miller as Pepe
 Eddie Bracken as Jojo Jordan
 Frances Langford as Eileen Eilers
 Desi Arnaz as Manuelito
 Hal Le Roy as Al Terwilliger 
 Libby Bennett as Tallulah Lou

 Harry Shannon as Mr. Casey
 Douglas Walton as Beverly Waverly
 Chester Clute as Lister
 Tiny Person as Midge Martin
 Ivy Scott as Mrs. Tewksbury
 Byron Shores as Sheriff Andaluz
 Van Johnson as chorus boy (uncredited)
 Grady Sutton as football coach (uncredited)

Cast notes:
Desi Arnaz, Eddie Bracken, Hal LeRoy, Libby Bennett, Ivy Scott, Byron Shores and Van Johnson all also appeared in the Broadway musical on which the film is based, playing the same characters.  It was the Broadway debut for all of them except LeRoy.
During the course of filming, Lucille Ball and Desi Arnaz fell in love. They eloped on November 30, 1940.

Production
RKO paid $100,000 for the rights to the Broadway musical. Filming on Too Many Girls began on June 22, 1940.

Songs
The songs in Too Many Girls were all written by Richard Rodgers, who composed the music, and Lorenz Hart, who wrote the lyrics.  The songs are:

 "You're Nearer" 
 "I Didn't Know What Time It Was" 
 "Spic and Spanish" 
 "Love Never Went to College"
 "'Cause We All Got Cake" 
 "Heroes in the Fall"
 "Pottawatomie".

All the songs also appeared in the Broadway musical, except for "You're Nearer".  Songs that were used in the stage musical and not used in the film were "Tempt Me Not", "My Prince", "I Like to Recognize the Tune", "The Sweethearts of the Team", "She Could Shake the Maracas", "Too Many Girls", and "Give it Back to the Indians".

Critical response
Bosley Crowther of The New York Times wrote that Too Many Girls was a "pleasant, light-hearted and wholly ingenuous campus film" but that director George Abbot "has permitted it to sag in the middle, at which point the thin spots baldly show." He complained that some of the dance numbers looked dark and gloomy. "If the intention was to be impressive, it has failed. For 'Too Many Girls' is a simple, conventional rah-rah picture, without any place for pretense. And there is not enough to it, on the whole, for Mr. Abbott to squander dancers recklessly."

References

External links 
 
 
 
 

1940 films
1940 musical comedy films
American black-and-white films
American football films
American musical comedy films
Films based on musicals
Films directed by George Abbott
Films set in universities and colleges
RKO Pictures films
1940s English-language films
1940s American films